Montezemolo (Piedmontese: Monzemo) is a village and comune (municipality) of c. 250 inhabitants in the Province of Cuneo in the Italian region Piedmont, located about  southeast of Turin and about  east of Cuneo.

Montezemolo borders the following municipalities: Camerana, Castelnuovo di Ceva, Cengio, Priero, Roccavignale, Sale delle Langhe, and Saliceto.

References 

Cities and towns in Piedmont
Comunità Montana Valli Mongia, Cevetta e Langa Cebana